"Gangsta Lean" is a song by American contemporary R&B/hip hop group DRS, issued as the first single from their debut studio album of the same name. The song spent six weeks at No. 1 on the Billboard R&B chart. It was the group's only hit on the Billboard Hot 100, peaking at No. 4 in 1993. The Recording Industry Association of America awarded it a platinum certification, selling over 1.1 million copies domestically. Its highest chart peak was on the New Zealand Singles Chart, where it spent three weeks at No. 1.

The single was released under Hammer's talent company, Roll Wit It Entertainment. A top selling song of the year at the time, "Gangsta Lean" has sold over 2.5 million copies with over 23.5 million views on YouTube. It was sampled by Juelz Santana on the album From Me to U in the outro song "This Is for My Homies".

Charts

Weekly charts

Year-end charts

See also 
List of number-one R&B singles of 1993 (U.S.)
List of number-one singles from the 1990s (New Zealand)

References 

1993 songs
1993 debut singles
Capitol Records singles
DRS (band) songs
Number-one singles in New Zealand
Contemporary R&B ballads
Songs written by Taura Stinson